Hammamet may refer to:

Hammamet, Algiers, a town and commune in Algiers Province, Algeria
Hammamet, Tébessa, a town and commune in Tébessa Province, Algeria
Hammamet, Tunisia, a coastal city on the northern edge of the Gulf of Hammamet
Gulf of Hammamet, a large gulf in northeastern Tunisia
Hammamet (film), a 2020 Italian biographical drama film